Shabalinsky District is an administrative and municipal district (raion), one of the thirty-nine in Kirov Oblast, Russia. It is located in the west of the oblast. Its administrative center is the urban locality (an urban-type settlement) of Leninskoye. Population:  14,013 (2002 Census);  The population of Leninskoye accounts for 46.6% of the district's total population.

People
 Alexey Dobrovolsky (Dobroslav) (October 13, 1938 - May 19, 2013) - a member of the dissident movement of the USSR in the 1950s - 1960s and ideologist of Slavic neopaganism (Rodnoverie). Since the 1990s, he lived in the village of Vasenyovo.

References

Notes

Sources

Districts of Kirov Oblast